, known as Tasofro for short, is a Japanese dojin game developer. They are best known for their collaborations with Team Shanghai Alice (ZUN), which include seven official games in the Touhou Project series.

Productions

Games

Music CDs

Collaborations with Team Shanghai Alice

Main members
  — General Producer/Character Graphics/System Graphics/Script/Sound Effects
  — Chief Programmer
 KuMa — Assistant Programmer
 alphes — Character Graphics
  — Character Graphics
  — Character Graphics, Background Graphics
 GOME — Character Graphics
 JUN — Sound Effects
   U2 — Music
 NKZ — Music

References

External links
 Twilight Frontier - official website 
 @tasofro - Twilight Frontier Twitter account 

Doujin soft developers
Video game companies of Japan
Video game development companies